An extragalactic planet, also known as an extragalactic exoplanet or an extroplanet, is a star-bound planet or rogue planet located outside of the Milky Way Galaxy. Due to the immense distances to such worlds, they would be very hard to detect directly. However, indirect evidence suggests that such planets exist. Nonetheless, the most distant known planets are SWEEPS-11 and SWEEPS-04, located in Sagittarius, approximately 27,710 light-years from the Sun, while the Milky Way is between 100,000 and 180,000 light years in diameter. This means that even galactic planets located farther than that distance have not been detected.

Candidate extragalactic planets

Twin Quasar-related planet
A microlensing event in the Twin Quasar gravitational lensing system was observed in 1996, by R. E. Schild, in the "A" lobe of the lensed quasar. It is predicted that a 3-Earth-mass planet in the lensing galaxy, YGKOW G1, caused the event. This was the first extragalactic planet candidate announced. This, however, is not a repeatable observation, as it was a one-time chance alignment. This predicted planet lies 4 billion light years away.

PA-99-N2
A team of scientists has used gravitational microlensing to come up with a tentative detection of an extragalactic exoplanet in Andromeda, the Milky Way's nearest large galactic neighbor. The lensing pattern fits a star with a smaller companion, PA-99-N2, weighing just around 6.34 times the mass of Jupiter. This suspected planet is the first announced in the Andromeda Galaxy.

Evidence of a population of rogue planets
A population of unbound planets between stars, with masses ranging from Lunar to Jovian masses, was indirectly detected, for the first time, by astrophysicists from the University of Oklahoma in 2018, in the lensing galaxy that lenses quasar RX J1131-1231 by microlensing.

M51-ULS-1b
In September 2020, the detection of a candidate planet orbiting the high-mass X-ray binary M51-ULS-1 in the Whirlpool Galaxy was announced. The planet was detected by eclipses of the X-ray source, which consists of a stellar remnant (either a neutron star or a black hole) and a massive star, likely a B-type supergiant. The planet would be slightly smaller than Saturn and orbit at a distance of some tens of AU. The study of M51-ULS-1b as the first known extragalactic planet candidate was published in Nature in October 2021.

Refuted extragalactic planets

HIP 13044 b
A planet with a mass of at least 1.25 times that of Jupiter had been potentially discovered by the European Southern Observatory (ESO) orbiting a star of extragalactic origin, even though the star now has been absorbed by our own galaxy. HIP 13044 is a star about 2,000 light years away in the southern constellation of Fornax, part of the Helmi stream of stars, a leftover remnant of a small galaxy that collided with and was absorbed by the Milky Way over 6 billion years ago.

However, subsequent analysis of the data revealed problems with the potential planetary detection: for example an erroneous barycentric correction had been applied (the same error had also led to claims of planets around HIP 11952 that were subsequently refuted). After applying the corrections, there is no evidence for a planet orbiting the star. If it had been real, the Jupiter-like planet would have been particularly interesting, orbiting a star nearing the end of its life and seemingly about to be engulfed by it, potentially providing an observational model for the fate of our own planetary system in the distant future.

See also

References

External links 

 Extragalactic planet candidate around high-mass X-ray binary M51-ULS-1 from Staringup in September 2020.

Types of planet
Exoplanetology
Extragalactic astronomy